The Rossi Shuttle Quik is an Italian ultralight trike that was designed by Paolo Rossi and produced by Rossi Soavi Paolo of Camposanto. When it was available the aircraft was supplied as custom-built, ready-to-fly-aircraft.

The company appears to be out of business and production of the design completed.

Design and development
It features a cable-braced P&M Quik hang glider-style high-wing, weight-shift controls, a two-seats-in-tandem open cockpit with a cockpit fairing, tricycle landing gear with wheel pants and a single engine in pusher configuration.

The aircraft is made from bolted-together aluminum tubing, with its double surface wing covered in Dacron sailcloth. Its  span wing is supported by a single tube-type kingpost and uses an "A" frame weight-shift control bar. The powerplant is a four-stroke,  RM engine or a four-cylinder, air and liquid-cooled, four-stroke, dual-ignition  Rotax 912ULS engine.

P&M Aviation do not normally supply wings to other manufacturers, but they had a longstanding relationship with Rossi that made them confident to do so in his case.

With the  RM powerplant, the Shuttle Quik may be the most powerful ultralight trike flown.

Specifications (Shuttle Quik)

References

External links
Archives of the company website on Archive.org
Photo of Rossi Shuttle Quik
Photo of Rossi Shuttle Quik

2000s Italian sport aircraft
2000s Italian ultralight aircraft
Single-engined pusher aircraft
Ultralight trikes